Villa Udaondo is a town in Buenos Aires Province, Argentina, it is located in the Ituzaingó Partido in Greater Buenos Aires.

The town is named after Guillermo Udaondo (14 December 1859 – 4 August 1922), Governor of Buenos Aires Province from 1894 to 1898.

External links

Populated places in Buenos Aires Province
Populated places established in 1940
Ituzaingó Partido